The Huntington Wagon Road is a historic road in Deschutes County, Oregon, United States.

About halfway between Bend and Redmond, Oregon, is a roughly one-square-mile parcel of public land where a section of the historic Huntington Road wagon trail has been preserved.  The parcel is managed by the Prineville district of the Bureau of Land Management (BLM).  At the beginning of the trail, which is closed to all motor vehicles, is a sign posted by the Deschutes County Historical Society that provides the following information:

See also
Oregon Historic Trails Advisory Council

References
http://blog.oregonlive.com/terryrichard/2010/05/huntington_wagon_road_a_worthy.html
http://www.waymarking.com/waymarks/WM3980
http://www.deschuteshistory.org/

External links

"This Road is History: Obscure wagon road may be the wrench in federal-state land deal", The Source Weekly, May 21, 2008

Historic trails and roads in Oregon
Protected areas of Deschutes County, Oregon
1867 establishments in Oregon
Bureau of Land Management areas in Oregon
Oregon Trail